Adolf Osterwalder (11 March 1872, in Kümmertshausen – 14 March 1961, in Wädenswil) was a Swiss zymologist and wine bacteriologist.

He studied natural sciences at Lausanne and Zürich, receiving his doctorate in 1898 with the dissertation Beiträge zur Embryologie von Aconitum Napellus L ("Contributions to the embryology of Aconitum napellus"). After graduation, he worked as an assistant plant pathologist and fermentation physiologist under Hermann Müller-Thurgau at the experimental institute in Wädenswil. In 1917 he attained the post of deputy director.

In 1903, he became a member of the Naturforschenden Gesellschaft in Zürich. Many of his scientific papers were published in the Zentralblatt für Bakteriologie and the Landwirtschaftliches Jahrbuch der Schweiz.

Selected works 
 Die Bakterien im Wein und Obstwein und die dadurch verursachten Veränderungen (with Hermann Müller-Thurgau, 1913) – Bacteria in wine and fruit wine, and the changes caused by it. 
 Krankheiten der Obstbäume und des Beerenobstes, 1928 – Diseases of fruit trees and berry fruits.
 Von Kaltgärhefen und Kaltgärung, 1934 – On cold fermentation yeasts and cold fermentation.  
 Anwendung und Vermehrung der Reinhefe, 1937 – Application and propagation of pure yeast.
 Pilzkrankheiten und tierische Feinde an Gemüsepflanzen und deren Bekämpfung (with Robert Wiesmann, 1939) – Fungal diseases and animal enemies of vegetables and their control.

References 

1872 births
1961 deaths
People from Weinfelden District
University of Zurich alumni
Swiss mycologists
Swiss bacteriologists